The Araucaria moist forests, officially classified as mixed ombrophilous forest (Portuguese: "Floresta Ombrófila Mista")  in Brazil, are a montane subtropical moist forest ecoregion. The forest ecosystem is located in southern Brazil and northeastern Argentina. The ecoregion is a southern portion of the Atlantic Forest. The ecoregion also includes select areas of open field called "campos de cima da serra" or "coxilhas" (highland fields).

Setting 

The ecoregion lies above , rising to  elevation on the high slopes of the Serra Geral.

The ecoregion is bounded by the Alto Paraná Atlantic forests to the north, west, and south, the Cerrado savannas and shrublands to the northeast, The Serra do Mar coastal forests to the east, and the Uruguayan savanna to the southwest.

Climate 
The Araucaria moist forests have an oceanic temperate climate (Cfb), with frequent frosts during the winter months and considerable snowfalls (generally light) in the highest areas.

Flora 
The ecoregion mostly consists of evergreen subtropical moist forests, with a canopy made up of the broadleaved trees Ocotea pretiosa, O. catharinense, and O. porosa (Lauraceae), Campomanesia xanthocarpa (Myrtaceae), and Mimosa scabrella and Parapiptadenia rigida (both Leguminosae). The forests are significant from an evolutionary perspective, as a relict of mixed coniferous and broadleaved forests that were once much more widespread, and are home to many taxa characteristic of the Antarctic flora.

Fauna 
The ecoregion is home to several threatened species endemic to the Atlantic forests, including the brown howler monkey (Alouatta guariba) and the red-spectacled parrot (Amazona pretrei). The Araucaria moist forests is recognized as an important endemic bird area.

Conservation and threats
The Araucaria moist forests are within the Atlantic Forest Biome (Mata Atlântica), which is recognized as a biodiversity hotspot by Conservation International, and as a Global 200 ecoregion by the World Wildlife Fund.

4.757% of the ecoregion is in protected areas. Protected areas include Aparados da Serra National Park, Araucárias National Park, Campos Gerais National Park, Guaricana National Park, Iguaçu National Park, São Joaquim National Park, Serra Geral National Park, and Serra do Itajaí National Park.

References

External links 
 

Atlantic Forest
Neotropical tropical and subtropical moist broadleaf forests
Ecoregions of Argentina
Ecoregions of Brazil
Forests of Brazil
.
Natural history of Argentina
Environment of São Paulo (state)
Environment of Paraná (state)
Environment of Santa Catarina (state)
Environment of Rio Grande do Sul
Geography of Misiones Province